is a Japanese track and field athlete. He competed in the 400 m hurdles event at the 2015 World Championships He also competed in the 2016 Summer Olympics where he ran 49.60 in the first heat of the 400 m hurdles but did not qualify further.

International competition

National titles
Japanese Championships
400 m hurdles: 2015

References

External links

Yuki Matsushita at Mizuno Track Club 

1991 births
Living people
Sportspeople from Kanagawa Prefecture
Japanese male hurdlers
Olympic male hurdlers
Olympic athletes of Japan
Athletes (track and field) at the 2016 Summer Olympics
World Athletics Championships athletes for Japan
Japan Championships in Athletics winners
20th-century Japanese people
21st-century Japanese people